VA-105 was an Attack Squadron of the U.S. Navy. It was established on 1 May 1952 and disestablished on 1 February 1959. Its nickname is unknown.

Operational history
VA-105 was commissioned on 1 May 1952 at NAS Cecil Field flying the AD-1 Skyraider.

In July–August 1958, the squadron flew close air support missions from Essex during the landing of U.S. Marines in Beirut, Lebanon.  Aircraft from VA-105 were the first to be on station during the landings, and squadron aircraft flew road and border reconnaissance sorties. Several aircraft were damaged by ground fire on their reconnaissance missions, however all aircraft returned safely to Essex.

In September 1958 when the Chinese communists began shelling the Quemoy Island group, Essex was ordered to transit the Suez Canal and report to the U.S. Seventh Fleet for duty in the Taiwan Straits.

In November 1958, the squadron's mission was changed to training personnel in the AD-6 Skyraider.

Home port assignments
The squadron was assigned to these home ports, effective on the dates shown:
 NAS Cecil Field – 1 May 1952
 NAS Jacksonville – July 1955
 NAS Cecil Field – April 1956
 NAS Jacksonville – November 1958

Aircraft assignment
The squadron first received the following aircraft on the dates shown:
 AD-1 Skyraider – 9 May 1952
 AD-4 Skyraider – 22 September 1952
 AD-4NA Skyraider- September 1952
 AD-6 Skyraider – November 1954

See also
 Attack aircraft
 List of inactive United States Navy aircraft squadrons
 History of the United States Navy

References

Attack squadrons of the United States Navy
Wikipedia articles incorporating text from the Dictionary of American Naval Aviation Squadrons